Vila Flor is a municipality in Portugal. Locally referred to as the Portuguese Capital of Olive Oil, Vila Flor is located in the Terra Quente Transmontana, in the southern part of the district of Bragança.

History

It was King Denis who, while travelling through the burg (then known as Póvoa d´Álem Sabor, became enchanted by the local landscape and, in 1286, renamed the district Vila Flor. Around 1295, the King ordered the construction of a walled city, consisting of five gates, to protect the fledgling settlement and guard Portuguese interests in the territory.

During the Middle Ages, this bouquet of flowers, as Cabral Adão (1910, in Vila Flor - 1992, in Almada), Vila Flor-born stomatology doctor and writer, once called it, became the home to many fleeing Jewish families, who settled in the territory to start farms and businesses of small industry (such as tanneries and jewelers). King Manuel eventually conferred on the settlement an official charter (foral), later to be reformulated in May 1512. Having favorable, tolerant views towards Portuguese Jews until he decided to marry Infanta Isabella of Aragon, Manuel I agreed to persecute the Jews of Portugal because the anti-Semite parents of his fiancée wouldn't approve that policy. King Manuel expelled the Jews from the municipality, whose remaining peoples or the army were then responsible for destroying the homes of the expelled Jews.

Geography

Administratively, the municipality is divided into 14 civil parishes (freguesias):

 Assares e Lodões
 Benlhevai
 Candoso e Carvalho de Egas
 Freixiel
 Roios
 Samões
 Sampaio
 Santa Comba de Vilariça
 Seixo de Manhoses
 Trindade
 Vale Frechoso
 Valtorno e Mourão
 Vila Flor e Nabo
 Vilas Boas e Vilarinho das Azenhas

Climate
Vila Flor has a Mediterranean climate with hot, dry summers and cold, wet winters.

Economy

Rich in history, tradition, monuments and citizenry, the municipality is also an important reference for agriculture, owing to the fertility of the Vilariça Valley (Vale da Vilariça). Olive oil and chestnut are among its main agricultural productions. Companies, such as Frize (a Sumol + Compal sparkling water brand) and Sousacamp (edible mushroom producer), known within and outside of Portugal, are located in within its municipal borders. The growth of tourism has meant that lodgings have developed throughout the region. Hotels and homestays, as well as establishments catering to rural- and agro-tourism, are found in the municipality. This tourist offer includes available options ranging from seasonal treks in the region to the municipal camping site and river beaches.

Notable citizens
 Joaquim Trigo de Negreiros (born 1900), lawyer and official of the civil registry, president of the administrative council of Vila Flor, before moving to Porto, becoming assistance Attorney of Portugal, Civil Governor of Porto, Subsecretary of State for Corporations and Social Security, and the Secretary of State for Social Security, in addition to providing public security forces with new equipment. For eight years he was minister of the Domestic Affairs, closed Tarrafal in 1954, and as member of the Parliament in various  legislatures, he was responsible for implementing the modern public health system: he originated the Hospital Escolar de Santa Maria and the Hospital of São João (in Porto), he was also responsible for the growth in nursing instruction (in 1947). He was a founder of the Diário Popular.
 Artur Guilherme Trigo Vaz (born 1919), doctor, municipal councillor (1951–54 and 1964–68), president of the municipal council (1970–74), responsible for Peneireiro Dam, and president/founder of the Sport Clube de Vila Flor; Vaz also dedicated himself to the history of Vila Flor, publishing the O Passado e o Presente, in December 1949.
 Raul de Sá Correia (May 1900 - 8 December 1993), municipal secretary (1934), responsible for the construction of the library, museum and archive. On his retirement he was named honorary citizen of the municipality and attributed a commemorative medal marking the 7th centenary of Vila Flor; a year later President Mário Soares honored him with Order of Henry the Navigator; and on his death a bronze bust was erected in front of his former home, and a hall in the museum dedicated to him.
 Francisco Maria Guerra (1876 - 1962), lawyer and administrator of the municipality of Miranda do Douro; conservator of the district land registry and president of the municipality of Vila Flor (1933-1946), he was responsible for a series of public works including the construction of several primary schools, bridges, cemeteries, warehouses, fountains, the opening of many municipal roads, squares and avenues, including Avenida Marechal Carmona. He was honored with the Military Order of Christ, and in 1962 (following his death), a bronze statue was erected in his honor.

References

External links
Discover Vila Flor

Municipalities of Bragança District